James (Jim) Ludlow is a Canadian business executive. He is currently the president for True North Sports & Entertainment's Real Estate Development division. Prior to 2014, he was the president and CEO of True North, which owns Canada Life Centre and the Winnipeg Jets of the National Hockey League.

Ludlow earned a Bachelor of Arts from the University of Manitoba, and a law degree from York University's Osgoode Hall Law School.

References

External links
Jim Ludlow's staff profile at Eliteprospects.com
Jim Ludlow bio from True North Sports & Entertainment website

Year of birth missing (living people)
Living people
Businesspeople from Winnipeg
True North Sports & Entertainment